Oricopis is a genus of longhorn beetles of the subfamily Lamiinae.

Species 
Oricopis contains the following species:

 Oricopis flavolineatus Breuning, 1939
 Oricopis guttatus Blackburn, 1894
 Oricopis insulana (Olliff, 1890)
 Oricopis intercoxalis Lea, 1917
 Oricopis maculiventris Lea, 1917
 Oricopis mediofasciatus (Breuning, 1959)
 Oricopis rufescens (Breuning, 1969)
 Oricopis setipennis Lea, 1917
 Oricopis umbrosus Pascoe, 1863

References

Desmiphorini